Total DramaRama (originally titled Total Drama Daycare) is an animated comedy children's television series created by Tom McGillis and Jennifer Pertsch that premiered on Cartoon Network in the United States on September 1, 2018, and on Teletoon in Canada on October 7, 2018. The show, serving as a crossover prequel spin-off as well as the second spin-off of Total Drama, following The Ridonculous Race, is set in an alternate universe of Total Drama and 6teen. The series is co-produced by Fresh TV and Corus Entertainment in association with Cartoon Network, and distributed by Cake Entertainment.

Premise 
The series re-introduces some of the original "Total Drama" characters in an alternate universe where they are aged down from teenagers to toddlers, being taken care of by Chef Hatchet. Each episode features dream sequences, cutaways, visual jokes, confessionals, and flashbacks. A Ridonculous Race contestant, MacArthur, has made recurring appearances and several other characters from the Total Drama series and The Ridonculous Race have made cameo appearances throughout the series.

Episodes

Characters

 Chef Hatchet (voiced by Deven Mack)
 Courtney (voiced by Emilie-Claire Barlow)
 Gwen (voiced by Lilly Bartlam)
 Duncan (voiced by Drew Nelson)
 Owen (voiced by Scott McCord)
 Izzy (voiced by Katie Crown)
 Noah (voiced by Cory Doran)
 Bridgette (voiced by Kristin Fairlie)
 Harold (voiced by Darren Frost)
 Beth (voiced by Sarah Gadon)
 Jude Lizowski (from 6teen) (voiced by Christian Potenza)
 Leshawna (voiced by Bahia Watson)
 Cody (voiced by Wyatt White)
 Lightning (voiced by Kwaku Adu-Podu)
 Sugar (voiced by Rochelle Wilson)
 MacArthur (from The Ridonculous Race) (voiced by Evany Rosen)

Production
The show was under production as of December 19, 2017 under the title Total Drama Daycare. It first aired on Cartoon Network in the United States on September 1, 2018. Jennifer Pertsch revealed in an interview with TV Kids that Fresh took "11 favorites from the original cast and aged them down to 4".

On February 13, 2019, the series was green lit for a second season. On June 23, 2020, Corus Entertainment announced that the series was renewed for a third season, which premiered in Canada in mid-year 2021. Revenge of the Island contestant, Lightning, and Pahkitew Island contestant, Sugar, were aged down to join the cast.

Broadcast

Streaming 
The first season is available to stream on HBO Max as of September 20, 2021. The second season is also available to stream on HBO Max. The first 25 episodes of the third season were added to HBO Max on June 6, 2022.

Reception

Critical
Total DramaRama has received mostly mixed reviews. Emily Ashby of Common Sense Media gave the series three stars out of five and found that it was as entertaining as previous entries in the Total Drama franchise, declaring that "Total Drama fans who tune in for DramaRama will appreciate the humor in seeing these familiar characters' big personalities in little bodies." The Washington Post found that "the satire that defined the “Total Drama” shows is less clever" than it had been in previous seasons, and recommended the series for ages 7 and up.

Ratings 
 
                      
| link2             = List of Total DramaRama episodes#Season 2 (2020–21)
| episodes2         = 51
| start2            = 
| end2              = 
| startrating2      = 0.47
| endrating2        = 0.30
| viewers2          = |2}} 

| link3             = List of Total DramaRama episodes#Season 3 (2021–22)
| episodes3         = 49
| start3            = 
| end3              = 
| startrating3      = 0.18
| endrating3        = 
| viewers3          = |2}} 
}}

References

External links 

 
 

Total Drama
2010s American animated television series
2020s American animated television series
2010s Canadian animated television series
2020s Canadian animated television series
2018 American television series debuts
2018 Canadian television series debuts
2022 American television series endings
2022 Canadian television series endings
American children's animated comedy television series
American animated television spin-offs
American flash animated television series
Canadian children's animated comedy television series
Canadian animated television spin-offs
Canadian flash animated television series
Crossover animated television series
English-language television shows
Cartoon Network original programming
Teletoon original programming
Surreal comedy television series
Television series by Fresh TV
Animated television series about children
Television shows filmed in Toronto
Child versions of cartoon characters
Prequel television series